Shur, Iran may refer to:

Shur, Qazvin
Shur, Tehran